Chris Ashwin born 19 November 1987 in England is a rugby union player who played for Bristol in the Guinness Premiership. He plays as a fly-half.

References

External links
 premiership profile

1987 births
Living people
Alumni of the University of Bath
Bristol Bears players
English rugby union players
Rugby union players from Gloucester
Team Bath rugby union players
Rugby union fly-halves